A data mart is a structure/access pattern specific to data warehouse environments, used to retrieve client-facing data. The data mart is a subset of the data warehouse and is usually oriented to a specific business line or team. Whereas data warehouses have an enterprise-wide depth, the information in data marts pertains to a single department. In some deployments, each department or business unit is considered the owner of its data mart including all the hardware, software and data.  This enables each department to isolate the use, manipulation and development of their data. In other deployments where conformed dimensions are used, this business unit owner will not hold true for shared dimensions like customer, product, etc.

Warehouses and data marts are built because the information in the database is not organized in a way that makes it readily accessible. This organization requires queries that are too complicated, difficult to access or resource intensive.

While transactional databases are designed to be updated, data warehouses or marts are read only. Data warehouses are designed to access large groups of related records. Data marts improve end-user response time by allowing users to have access to the specific type of data they need to view most often, by providing the data in a way that supports the collective view of a group of users.

A data mart is basically a condensed and more focused version of a data warehouse that reflects the regulations and process specifications of each business unit within an organization. Each data mart is dedicated to a specific business function or region. This subset of data may span across many or all of an enterprise's functional subject areas. It is common for multiple data marts to be used in order to serve the needs of each individual business unit (different data marts can be used to obtain specific information for various enterprise departments, such as accounting, marketing, sales, etc.).

The related term spreadmart is a pejorative describing the situation that occurs when one or more business analysts develop a system of linked spreadsheets to perform a business analysis, then grow it to a size and degree of complexity that makes it nearly impossible to maintain. The term for this condition is "Excel Hell".

Data mart vs data warehouse
Data warehouse:
 Holds multiple subject areas
 Holds very detailed information
 Works to integrate all data sources
 Does not necessarily use a dimensional model but feeds dimensional models.

Data mart:
 Often holds only one subject area- for example, Finance, or Sales
 May hold more summarized data (although it may hold full detail)
 Concentrates on integrating information from a given subject area or set of source systems
 Is built focused on a dimensional model using a star schema.

Design schemas 

Star schema - fairly popular design choice; enables a relational database to emulate the analytical functionality of a multidimensional database
Snowflake schema
Activity schema - a time-series based schema

Reasons for creating a data mart 
 Easy access to frequently needed data
 Creates a collective view by a group of users
 Improves end-user response time
 Ease of creation
 Lower cost than implementing a full data warehouse
 Potential users are more clearly defined than in a full data warehouse
 Contains only business essential data and is less cluttered.
 It has key  data information

Dependent data mart 
According to the Inmon school of data warehousing, a dependent data mart is a logical subset (view) or a physical subset (extract) of a larger data warehouse, isolated for one of the following reasons:

A need refreshment for a special data model or schema: e.g., to restructure for OLAP
Performance: to offload the data mart to a separate computer for greater efficiency or to eliminate the need to manage that workload on the centralized data warehouse.
Security: to separate an authorized data subset selectively
Expediency: to bypass the data governance and authorizations required to incorporate a new application on the Enterprise Data Warehouse
Proving Ground: to demonstrate the viability and ROI (return on investment) potential of an application prior to migrating it to the Enterprise Data Warehouse
Politics: a coping strategy for IT (Information Technology) in situations where a user group has more influence than funding or is not a good citizen on the centralized data warehouse.
Politics: a coping strategy for consumers of data in situations where a data warehouse team is unable to create a usable data warehouse.

According to the Inmon school of data warehousing, tradeoffs inherent with data marts include limited scalability, duplication of data, data inconsistency with other silos of information, and inability to leverage enterprise sources of data.

The alternative school of data warehousing is that of Ralph Kimball. In his view, a data warehouse is nothing more than the union of all the data marts. This view helps to reduce costs and provides fast development, but can create an inconsistent data warehouse, especially in large organizations. Therefore, Kimball's approach is more suitable for small-to-medium corporations.

See also 
 Data warehouse
 Enterprise architecture
 OLAP cube

References

External links

Data warehousing
Management cybernetics